Idiomorphus is a genus of beetles in the family Carabidae, containing the following species:

 Idiomorphus guerini Chaudoir, 1846
 Idiomorphus mirabilis Jedlicka, 1960
 Idiomorphus xanthochrous Britton, 1937

References

Orthogoniinae